Beyond the End of Despair... is the third full-length album by Japanese power metal band Galneryus. It was released on July 12, 2006.

Track listing

Credits
Syu - Lead/rhythm guitars/backing vocals
Yama-B - Vocals
Tsui - Bass/backing vocals
Yuhki - Keyboards/backing vocals
Junichi Satoh - Drums

Chart performance
The album reached number 57 on the Oricon album charts.

References

External links
 Official Galneryus website 

Galneryus albums
2006 albums